Bedlam is a TRS-80 based text adventure game written for the TRS-80 by Robert Arnstein and released by Tandy Corporation in 1982. It was ported to the TRS-80 Color Computer. The object of the game is to escape a lunatic asylum. There are several ways to escape but only one random exit is active each time the game is loaded.

Gameplay 

The game is text only. Players move through the asylum by typing simple instructions using a verb-noun command such as, "go north" or "get the key". There are NPCs such as Houdini and Picasso that can be either helpful or an obstacle.

References

External links 
 Bedlam, a site dedicated to the game along with a web-based emulator to play the actual game.
 An article from the Dallas Observer which includes a discussion of the manual's cover art.
 

1980s interactive fiction
1982 video games
Adventure games
TRS-80 games
TRS-80 Color Computer games
Video games developed in the United States
Video games set in psychiatric hospitals